Melissa Kuys (born 9 December 1987) is an Australian rules footballer who played for Collingwood and St Kilda in the AFL Women's (AFLW).

Early life and state football

Kuys started playing football at the age of eight, playing in the junior boys' competition with Rowville. During her football journey she played for the Eastern Lions, Scoresby, and Knox. In 2016, she captained Knox and won the best and fairest award in a season in which the club only won one game.

During the off-season between the 2017 and 2018 AFLW seasons, Kuys was selected as the inaugural captain of Box Hill Hawks, after they assumed the VFL Women's license of the relegated Knox.

AFL Women's career

Collingwood
Kuys was selected by Collingwood with pick 118. She made her debut in round 2, 2017, in a match at IKON Park against Melbourne. Collingwood re-signed Kuys for the 2018 season during the trade period in May 2017. Collingwood re-signed Kuys for the 2019 season during the trade period in June 2018. In April 2019, Kuys was delisted by Collingwood.

St Kilda
At the end of April 2019, Kuys was signed by St Kilda as a delisted free agent. In August 2020, she was delisted by St Kilda.

Personal life
Apart from her sports career, Kuys is a chef and runs her own catering company.

Statistics
Statistics are correct to the end of the 2019 season.

|- style="background-color: #eaeaea"
! scope="row" style="text-align:center" | 2017
|style="text-align:center;"|
| 9 || 6 || 0 || 0 || 47 || 9 || 56 || 13 || 12 || 0.0 || 0.0 || 7.8 || 1.5 || 9.3 || 2.2 || 2.0
|- 
! scope="row" style="text-align:center" | 2018
|style="text-align:center;"|
| 9 || 7 || 2 || 1 || 50 || 15 || 65 || 19 || 14 || 0.3 || 0.1 || 7.1 || 2.1 || 9.3 || 2.7 || 2.0
|- style="background-color: #eaeaea"
! scope="row" style="text-align:center" | 2019
|style="text-align:center;"|
| 9 || 2 || 0 || 0 || 7 || 0 || 7 || 5 || 2 || 0.0 || 0.0 || 3.5 || 0.0 || 3.5 || 2.5 || 1.0
|- class="sortbottom"
! colspan=3| Career
! 15
! 2
! 1
! 104
! 24
! 128
! 37
! 28
! 0.1
! 0.1
! 6.9
! 1.6
! 8.5
! 2.5
! 1.9
|}

References

External links

 

Living people
1987 births
Collingwood Football Club (AFLW) players
Australian rules footballers from Melbourne
Sportswomen from Victoria (Australia)
Australian chefs
Victorian Women's Football League players